Stenanthemum bremerense is a species of flowering plant in the family Rhamnaceae and is endemic to the southwest of Western Australia. It is an erect, or low spreading shrub with hairy young stems, broadly egg-shaped leaves and densely hairy heads of tube-shaped flowers, sometimes with whitish floral leaves.

Description
The upper surface of the leaves is minutely pimply, and the lower surface is densely covered with greyish, star-shaped hairs. The leaves are mostly folded lengthwise.

Taxonomy and naming
Stenanthemum bremerense was first formally described in 2007 by Barbara Lynette Rye in the journal Nuytsia from specimens collected in 2004. The specific epithet (bremerense) refers to the Bremer Range, as the species mainly occurs near it.

Distribution and habitat
This species grows on laterite outcrops and breakaways near the Bremer Range and in a single location near Marvel Loch, in the Coolgardie bioregion of south-western Western Australia.

Conservation status
Stenanthemum bremerense is listed as "Priority Four" by the Government of Western Australia Department of Biodiversity, Conservation and Attractions, meaning that it is rare or near threatened.

References

bremerense
Rosales of Australia
Flora of Western Australia
Plants described in 2007
Taxa named by Barbara Lynette Rye